Nikolas Ketner (born February 13, 1991) is a Slovak professional ice hockey defenceman who played with HC Slovan Bratislava in the Slovak Extraliga during the 2010–11 season.

References

External links

Living people
HC Slovan Bratislava players
Slovak ice hockey defencemen
1991 births
HC '05 Banská Bystrica players
Slovak expatriate ice hockey players in the Czech Republic
Ice hockey people from Bratislava
HC Stadion Litoměřice players